KS Basket 25 Bydgoszcz is a Polish professional women's basketball club that was founded in 1913 in the city of Bydgoszcz. Artego Bydgoszcz plays in the Energa Basket Liga Kobiet, the highest competition in Poland and in the EuroCup Women.

Honours
 Polish Championship:
 2nd place (4): 2015, 2016, 2018, 2020
 3nd place (3): 2013, 2014, 2021
 Polish Cup: 
 Winner (1): 2017-18
EuroCup Women: 
 Round of 16: 2017-18, 2018–19, 2019–20

Current roster

References

External links
 Official Website

Women's basketball teams in Poland
Sport in Bydgoszcz
Basketball teams established in 1994